This is a list of men's national handball teams in the world.

AHF (Asia)

CAHB (Africa)

EHF (Europe) 

 
 
 
 
 
 
 
 
 
 
 
 
 

 
 
 
 
 
 
  (special member)

OHF (Oceania)

PATHF (Pan-America)

See also

References

 List of member federations at IHF's site

 
Handball
 National